Maik Odenthal (born 7 November 1992) is a German footballer who plays as a midfielder for KFC Uerdingen 05.

Career
Odenthal made his professional debut for VfL Osnabrück in the 3. Liga on 26 August 2014, coming on as a substitute in the 90+2nd minute for Milad Salem in the 1–0 away win against Fortuna Köln.

References

External links
 Profile at DFB.de
 Profile at kicker.de

1992 births
Living people
People from Rhein-Kreis Neuss
Sportspeople from Düsseldorf (region)
Footballers from North Rhine-Westphalia
German footballers
Association football midfielders
Bonner SC players
Borussia Mönchengladbach II players
VfL Osnabrück players
Rot-Weiß Oberhausen players
KFC Uerdingen 05
3. Liga players
Regionalliga players